The Vault is an Indian Hindi and English business reality television series that airs on ET Now and Times Now. The show is the Indian version of  British reality television business programme Dragon's Den. The show's first season featured 43 Indian start-ups that catered to multiple industry verticals. Of these, 16 start-ups received investments summing up to 11 crores Indian rupees at varying equity rates.

It shows budding entrepreneurs pitching their business or business ideas to a panel of investors called Vault Keepers and seeking funding for their ventures. The Vault Keepers decide whether to invest in their company.

Series overview

Investors

See also 
 Shark Tank India
 Dragons' Den (British TV programme)

References 

2016 Indian television series debuts
Business-related television series
Hindi-language television shows
2010s Indian television series
Indian television series based on non-Indian television series
The Times of India